The 2023 Nigerian presidential election in Kogi State will be held on 25 February 2023 as part of the nationwide 2023 Nigerian presidential election to elect the president and vice president of Nigeria. Other federal elections, including elections to the House of Representatives and the Senate, will also be held on the same date while state elections will be held two weeks afterward on 11 March.

Background
Kogi State is a diverse state in the North Central with a large number of mineral resources but facing an underdeveloped agricultural sector, deforestation, and low vaccination rates. Politically, the state's early 2019 elections were described by a swing towards the APC as the party was mainly successful, unseating almost all PDP senators and house members to sweep most House of Representatives and two senate seats as the state was won by APC presidential nominee Muhammadu Buhari with over 54%. The House of Assembly election also was a win for the APC as the party won every seat in the assembly. The November election ended similarly with incumbent Bello winning election to a second term of governor and the APC gained a senate seat in a rerun election; however, both elections were riddled with irregularities and electoral violence.

Polling

Projections

General election

Results

By senatorial district 
The results of the election by senatorial district.

By federal constituency
The results of the election by federal constituency.

By local government area 
The results of the election by local government area.

See also 
 2023 Kogi State elections
 2023 Nigerian presidential election

Notes

References 

Kogi State gubernatorial election
2023 Kogi State elections
Kogi